The St. Anthony Cathedral (also Huancavelica Cathedral) is the main Catholic church in Huancavelica, a city in the South American country of Peru. It was constructed between the 16th and 17th centuries and was initially built by the Tonsurados. The predominant architectural style is Churrigueresque Baroque.

This cathedral was formerly known as the Mother Church of San Antonio.

See also
Roman Catholicism in Peru

References

Roman Catholic cathedrals in Peru
Roman Catholic churches completed in 1608
17th-century Roman Catholic church buildings in Peru